Kabalar can refer to the following villages in Turkey:

 Kabalar, Alaplı
 Kabalar, Beypazarı
 Kabalar, Çal
 Kabalar, Çine
 Kabalar, İnebolu